cAMP-dependent protein kinase inhibitor gamma is a protein that in humans is encoded by the PKIG gene.

The protein encoded by this gene is a member of the cAMP-dependent protein kinase (PKA) inhibitor family. Studies of a similar protein in mice suggest that this protein acts as a potent competitive PKA inhibitor, and is a predominant form of PKA inhibitors in various tissues. Three alternatively spliced transcript variants encoding the same protein have been reported.

References

Further reading